Saint-Gonnery is a commune in the Morbihan department of Brittany in north-western France. Inhabitants of Saint-Gonnery are called in French Gonneriens.

See also
Communes of the Morbihan department
Goneri of Brittany, hermit saint

References

External links

 Mayors of Morbihan Association 

Saintgonnery